William Luther Rhodes, Jr. (1918-1986) was an associate justice of the South Carolina Supreme Court. Rhodes was elected to the South Carolina Supreme Court in 1975. He was sworn in on August 14, 1975, to replace Justice Lewis as an associate justice.
Served in South Carolina House of Representatives from 1951 to 1960, and in the Judge South Carolina Fourteenth Judicial Circuit from 1960 to 1975. He was reelected to a full ten-year term in 1978.

References

Justices of the South Carolina Supreme Court
1918 births
1986 deaths
20th-century American judges